The Rutgers Scarlet Knights men's lacrosse team represents Rutgers University main campus in National Collegiate Athletic Association (NCAA) Division I college lacrosse. The program first started at the varsity level in 1887. The coach is currently Brian Brecht, who is in his eighth year at that position and who joined Rutgers after previously coaching at Siena College. The team plays its home games at SHI Stadium. On July 1, 2014, Rutgers joined the Big Ten Conference in all sports.

History

Rutgers began playing lacrosse in 1887. The team lasted 3 years, folding in 1889 after it 2–1 season. The program was re-instated in 1920 due in part to the efforts of Harland W. “Tots” Meistrell. In 1926 Fred Fitch took over the program and began a period of national prominence. The team joined the USILA and in 1928 was awarded one of the association's gold medals as an outstanding team, along with three other teams that also shared the championship (Johns Hopkins, Maryland, and Navy). In 1932 the Rutgers team, led by “the best attack pair in the country” George Latimer and Frenchy Julien participated in the U.S. Olympic team tryouts. During Fitch's 22 seasons the team posted a record of 106–71–8. Al Twitchell took over the reins in 1950 with the retirement of Fitch. In 1955 he guided the team to a co-national championship of the USILA's Laurie Cox (Class B) Division.

Rutgers plays Princeton for the Meistrell Cup in honor of Harland (Tots) Meistrell who in addition to re-instating the lacrosse program at Rutgers, he also restarted the dormant lacrosse program at Princeton in 1921.  Rutgers also plays Penn State for the Friendship Cup which is a symbol of the friendship of four friends from Sewanhaka High School on Long Island who went off to college splitting two ways; one pair attending Penn State, and the other heading off to Rutgers.

Rutgers appeared in its first NCAA tournament in 1972. In the 1986 tournament, Rutgers defeated C.W. Post, 13–8, in the first round, before falling 5–17 to Syracuse in the quarterfinals. The Scarlet Knights most recent NCAA tournament victory came in the 2021 NCAA Division I Men's Lacrosse Championship, as they defeated Lehigh by a score of 12–5, before losing 11–12 in the quarterfinals to North Carolina. It was the Scarlet Knight's first NCAA tournament victory in 31 years. The following season, the Scarlet Knights made the Final Four for the first time with an 11-9 quarterfinal victory over Penn.

Since its inception in 1887, the Scarlet Knights have won 560 games and one national Class B championship, as well as producing 197 All-Americans and 10 lacrosse hall of famers.

Season Results
The following is a list of Rutgers's results by season as an NCAA Division I program:

{| class="wikitable"

|- align="center"

†NCAA canceled 2020 collegiate activities due to the COVID-19 virus.

Alumni in the Premier Lacrosse League (10)

References

NCAA Division I men's lacrosse teams
College men's lacrosse teams in the United States
Big Ten Conference men's lacrosse
Lacrosse teams in New Jersey
Men
1887 establishments in New Jersey
Lacrosse clubs established in 1887